The Timor-Leste national basketball team  represents East Timor in international basketball competitions and is managed by the National Basketball Federation of East Timor abbreviated as FNBTL (Portuguese: Nacional de Basquetebol de Timor-Leste).

History
Prior to the team's national federation admission to FIBA in 2013, the national team participated at the 2006 Lusophony Games. The team lost its five games against Angola, Cape Verde, Guinea-Bissau and Portugal with an average score of 166-39. East Timor did not score more than 39 points against all opposition except against Portugal, whom they scored 69 points against.

Timor-Leste's first tournament as part of FIBA was the 2015 Southeast Asian Games facing Indonesia, Malaysia and the Philippines in the group stage.

Timor-Leste was initially assigned to FIBA Asia; on 2015, it was reassigned to FIBA Oceania "to facilitate the development of the game in the country and the participation of its athletes in international competitions."

Results

Summer Olympics
yet to qualify

FIBA World Cup
yet to qualify

FIBA Oceania Championship
never participated

Oceania Basketball Tournament

never participated

Lusophony Games

2006 – 6th place
2009–2014 – Did not participate

Southeast Asian Games

2015 – 9th

Current roster

At the 2015 Southeast Asian Games: (incomplete)

|}

| valign="top" |

Head coach

Assistant coaches

Legend

Club – describes lastclub before the tournament
Age – describes ageon 9 June 2015
|}

Coaches
 Leandro Dos Santos (2015– )

References

East Timor national basketball team
Men's national basketball teams
2013 establishments in East Timor